The Green Algeria Alliance, short Green Alliance was an Islamist coalition of political parties, created on 7 March 2012 for the Algerian legislative election, 2012. It consisted of the Movement of Society for Peace (Hamas), Islamic Renaissance Movement (Ennahda) and the Movement for National Reform (Islah). The alliance was led by Bouguerra Soltani of the Hamas.

The alliance was dissolved in 2017.

References

2012 establishments in Algeria
Algerian democracy movements
Political parties established in 2012
Islamism in Algeria
Islamic political parties in Algeria
Political party alliances in Algeria
Islamic organisations based in Algeria